Polypterus endlicheri Heckel 1847, the saddled bichir, is one of the largest species of the Polypterus genus of freshwater fish.

Named in honor of botanist Stephan Endlicher (1804-1849), who apparently discovered the species in the fish collection at the Naturhistorisches Museum (Vienna).

Description
The species reaches a maximum recorded length of about 63 cm (24.8 in) as an unsexed male. The maximum recorded weight was about 3.3 kg (7.3 lb).  It can be identified by its flattened head with a prominent lower jaw that is larger than its upper jaw. Its dorsal side is of a green and yellow color. Its head and fins also have black spots on them.

This fish is recorded to be piscivorous. Their diet also includes snails and crustaceans. Their reproduction cycle begins in the rainy season when the chemistry of the water and temperature change. This species is also known to be an egg scatterer. P. endlicheri can live in aquaria with proper maintenance.

Habitat and distribution
Polypterus endlicheri is recorded to be found in freshwater habitats within demersal depth ranges. This species is native to a tropical climate.

P. endlicheri is found in the Nile River, the Chad Basin, the Niger River, the Volta River, and the Bandama River of Africa. This species is native to Cameroon, Nigeria, Burkina Faso, Ghana, Chad, the Ivory Coast, Mali, Sudan, Benin, and the Central African Republic.

See also
List of freshwater aquarium fish species

References

External links 
 

Polypteridae
Taxa named by Johann Jakob Heckel
Fish described in 1847